7J or 7-J can refer to:

7J, code for Lake Oswego School District
7J, IATA code for Tajik Air
MD 7J, see Maryland Route 7
7J, code for No. 7 (Belgian AF) Squadron RAF, see List of RAF Squadron Codes
7J, the production code for the 1988–89 Doctor Who serial The Greatest Show in the Galaxy

See also
J7 (disambiguation)